The Wattsburg School District is a public school district serving parts of Erie County, Pennsylvania. Centered in Wattsburg, the townships of Amity, Venango, Greene, and Greenfield are also included in district boundaries. The district contains three schools: Wattsburg Area Elementary Center, Wattsburg Area Middle School, and Seneca High School.

References

External links
 

School districts in Erie County, Pennsylvania